Paulistânia is a municipality in the state of São Paulo in Brazil. The population is 1,834 (2020 est.) in an area of 257 km². The elevation is 645 m.

References

Municipalities in São Paulo (state)